Nando Mathieu (born December 22, 1949) is a retired Swiss professional ice hockey forward who represented the Swiss national team at the 1976 Winter Olympics.

References

External links

1949 births
Living people
Ice hockey players at the 1976 Winter Olympics
Olympic ice hockey players of Switzerland
Swiss ice hockey forwards